The Majors were an American R&B and doo-wop group from Philadelphia, Pennsylvania, United States.

The vocal ensemble formed in 1961, and featured as its lead singer Ricky Cordo, who was noted for his prominent falsetto. The group was noticed by producer Jerry Ragovoy, who produced their hit single "A Wonderful Dream", released in 1962 on Imperial Records. It would be the first of three charting hits for the group.

Original members
Ricky Cordo (lead)
Idella Morris
Eugene Glass
Frank Troutt, Sr.
Ronald Gathers
Bobby Tate (Guitarist)
Replacements:
Frank L Troutt Jr (lead)
Joanna Craddock-Crump
Richard Hatcher 
Perry Martin

Singles
"A Wonderful Dream" / "Time Will Tell" (1962) U.S. R&B No. 23, U.S. No. 22
"She's A Troublemaker" / "A Little Bit Now (A Little Bit Later)" (1962) U.S. No. 63
"Anything You Can Do" / "What In The World" (1963) 
"Tra La La" / "What Have You Been Doin'" (1963)
"One Happy Ending" / "Get Up Now" (1963)
"Your Life Begins (At Sweet Sixteen)" / "Which Way Did She Go" (1963)
"I'll Be There (To Bring You Love)" / "Ooh Wee Baby" (1964)

References

External links
The Majors biography and discography

Doo-wop groups
Musical groups from Pennsylvania